Grace Kelly (born 18 April 1994) is an Australian rules footballer who plays for St Kilda in the AFL Women's (AFLW). She has previously played for West Coast Eagles. She is the sister of Adelaide player Niamh Kelly.

AFLW career
In April 2019, Kelly joined West Coast as an international rookie together with her sister Niamh Kelly.

In June 2022, Kelly was traded to St Kilda.

Personal life
Kelly is the sister of Adelaide player Niamh Kelly.

References

External links

 

Living people
1994 births
Mayo inter-county ladies' footballers
West Coast Eagles (AFLW) players
Irish female players of Australian rules football
Irish expatriate sportspeople in Australia
Ladies' Gaelic footballers who switched code